City Lights is the debut extended play by South Korean singer Baekhyun. It was released on July 10, 2019 by SM Entertainment. The album features six tracks, including the lead single "UN Village".

Background and release 
On June 10, 2019, it was announced that Baekhyun will debut as a solo artist in July. At midnight on June 20, the album's title and release date were announced. SM Entertainment began releasing teasers on July 2 through Exo's official social media accounts. Additionally, Baekhyun posted a teaser for his debut through a vlog on his official YouTube channel.

The album and its title track's music video were released on July 10 at 6PM KST both digitally and physically. On July 12, a live session video of "UN Village" was released. A third version of the album was released on July 19.

Composition and production
City Lights has six songs which feature R&B, hip hip hop and pop genres. The album's title track "UN Village" is a romantic R&B love song that combines groovy beats and string sound with sensational lyrics about a romantic moment a couple share under the moonlight of UN Village hill.

Various world-renowned music producer Darkchild, The Stereotypes, Cha Cha Malone, LDN Noise have participated in the album. Korean rapper Beenzino was featured in the side track "Stay Up!", a dreamy R&B song with lyrics that draw attention by mentioning special nights with his loved one in sexy narrative.

The third track "Betcha" is a hip hop R&B with urban beats song with lyrics that tells a story about a cute yet confident attitude of a man who is confident that the other person is destined for love. "Ice Queen" is characterized as an R&B song with a sophisticated beat and a catchy melody with lyrics about winning the girls' cold heart with his warm one. "Diamond" is described as an R&B ballad with impressive major and minor melodies with the lyrics that compare love for lovers to a solidly glowing diamond. The last song "Psycho" is an electronic pop that expresses the inner selves of a man lost among confused emotions.

Promotion 
Before the music video and album's release, Baekhyun held a private showcase in Seoul Arts Center where he performed the lead single "UN Village" for the first time for the media. Two hours after the release, he appeared on a live broadcast through the Naver app V Live where he talked about the process of the album and performed "UN Village", "Betcha" and "Ice Queen". On July 11, Baekhyun uploaded a vlog titled "UN Village behind clip" through his YouTube channel where he revealed parts of the filming process for his music video.

On July 12, Baekhyun performed "UN Village" on You Hee-yeol's Sketchbook. On the same day, he also started performing "UN Village" on South Korean music programs from July 12 on Music Bank. The song has since achieved a total of three trophies.

Reception 
City Lights received generally positive reviews from critics. Tamar Hermann of Billboard opined that Baekhyun's "expressive vocals relay a wide array of emotions". She added that by frequently layering different recordings atop of one another, "the wide range of Baekhyun's tone and artistic style" was revealed. Riddhi Chakraborty of Rolling Stone India stated that "Baekhyun's penchant for romantic ballads is forgotten as he makes a complete immersion into dark and heady R&B". She concluded that by releasing City Lights, Baekhyun "has proven that he understands exactly what kind of artist he is and what he's capable of, therefore he's unafraid to be seen in a brand new light".

Commercial performance 
On July 9, it was reported that the pre-order sales of City Lights reached 401,545 copies in eight days. Shortly after its release, the EP topped over 67 countries' iTunes charts. City Lights went on to debut atop the Gaon Album Chart for the week ending on July 13, becoming his first chart-topper. The EP became the top-selling album of July 2019 on Gaon's Album Chart with a total of 508,321 sales. It eventually sold over 576,029 copies, which made it the best-selling solo album in South Korea since Hestory (2003) by Kim Gun-mo, until it was surpassed by Baekhyun's second EP Delight the following year.

The EP also attained international success by debuting at number four on the Billboard World Albums Chart, becoming his first top-five entry on the chart. City Lights sold 1,000 copies in the United States according to Nielsen Music, despite less than two full days of sales for the Billboard week's charts. In France, City Lights peaked at number 20 on the French Digital Albums Chart. The EP also debuted at 8 on the Billboard Japan Hot Albums Chart and number 31 on the Australian Digital Album Chart, making it his first album to chart in both countries.

Track listing

Charts

Weekly charts

Year-end charts

Sales

Certifications

Accolades

Release history

See also 
 List of certified albums in South Korea
 List of K-pop songs on the Billboard charts
 List of K-pop albums on the Billboard charts
 List of Gaon Album Chart number ones of 2019

References

Baekhyun albums
2019 debut EPs
SM Entertainment EPs
Korean-language EPs
IRiver EPs